or Ara River may refer to:

 Arakawa River (Kanto), which flows from Saitama Prefecture and through Tokyo to Tokyo Bay
 Arakawa River (Uetsu), which flows from Yamagata Prefecture and through Niigata Prefecture to the Sea of Japan.
 Arakawa River (Fukushima), which starts and finishes in Fukushima City, Fukushima